Hvozdec is a municipality and village in Beroun District in the Central Bohemian Region of the Czech Republic. It has about 300 inhabitants.

Administrative parts
The village of Mrtník is an administrative part of Hvozdec.

History
The first written mention of Hvozdec is from 1543.

Gallery

References

External links

Villages in the Beroun District